Jølster is a former municipality in Sogn og Fjordane county, Norway. It was located in the traditional district of Sunnfjord. The administrative centre was the village of Skei. Other villages in the municipality included Helgheim, Ålhus, Vassenden, and Langhaugane.

Jølster was located at the centre of the old Sogn og Fjordane county and was known for its rich cultural traditions in home crafts, folk music, song, dancing, and creative arts. Agriculture was the largest industry in the municipality. The principal attraction in Jølster was the scenery, with easy access to the glaciers Grovabreen, Jostedalsbreen, and Myklebustbreen. Jølster was home to part of the largest glacier of continental Europe, the Jostedalsbreen as well as a clear green lake named Jølstravatnet. The trout caught in Jølstravatn were renowned throughout Norway and beyond.

At the time of its dissolution in 2020, the  municipality is the 168th largest by area out of the 422 municipalities in Norway. Jølster is the 260th most populous municipality in Norway with a population of 3,047.

In 2016, the chief of police for Vestlandet formally suggested a reconfiguration of police districts and stations. He proposed that the police station in Jølster be closed.

General information

The parish of Jølster was established as a municipality on 1 January 1838 (see formannskapsdistrikt law). The original municipality was identical to the Jølster parish (prestegjeld) with the sub-parishes of Ålhus and Helgheim.  During the 1960s, there were many municipal mergers across Norway due to the work of the Schei Committee. On 1 January 1964, the farm area of Førde in the neighboring municipality of Breim (population: 38) was transferred to Jølster municipality.

On 1 January 2020, the neighboring municipalities of Jølster, Førde, Naustdal, and Gaular were merged to form the new Sunnfjord Municipality.

Name
The municipality (originally the parish) is named after the Jølstra River, which runs through the lower parts of the municipality. The name is a word for the noise and rumble of the river.

Coat of arms
The coat of arms were granted on 22 July 1983. The arms are derived from the arms of Audun Hugleiksson from Hegranes in the present municipality, who died in 1302. He was a Middle Ages nobleman who lived in Jølster and built Audunborg, one of only two private stone castles in Norway. On his seals, he used a shield with a rose, surrounded with a bordure of fleur-de-lis. The arms of Jølster are derived from this bordure. The symbol is gold on a red background.

Churches
The Church of Norway had two parishes within the municipality of Jølster. It was part of the Sunnfjord prosti (deanery) in the Diocese of Bjørgvin.

Government
All municipalities in Norway, including Jølster, are responsible for primary education (through 10th grade), outpatient health services, senior citizen services, unemployment and other social services, zoning, economic development, and municipal roads. The municipality is governed by a municipal council of elected representatives, which in turn elect a mayor.  The municipality falls under the Sogn og Fjordane District Court and the Gulating Court of Appeal.

Municipal council
The municipal council  of Jølster was made up of 25 representatives that were elected to four year terms. The party breakdown of the final municipal council was as follows:

Mayor
The mayor of a municipality in Norway is a representative of the majority party of the municipal council who is elected to lead the council. Oddmund Klakegg of the Centre Party was elected mayor for the 2011–2015 term.  He was re-elected for the 2015–2019 term as well.

Geography

The Jølstravatnet lake splits the municipality in half, which creates a centre of population at each end of the lake: Skei in the eastern end of the lake and Vassenden (English: the water-end) in the western part, where the river Jølstra starts. A small end of the lake Breimsvatnet crosses over into the municipality of Jølster.

Jølster is bordered to the north by the municipalities of Stryn and Gloppen, to the east by Luster, to the southeast by Sogndal, and to the south and west by Førde. The Jostedalsbreen National Park lies partially in this municipality.

Economy
Tourism is one of the largest industries in Jølster, and there are hotels, campsites, and a number of tourist facilities in each centre of the municipality. In addition to tourism, agriculture and construction are the other most important industries.

Attractions

Astruptunet
Astruptunet was the home of the painter Nikolai Astrup (1880–1928) for the last fourteen years of his life. The Astrup Farm (Astruptunet) was the artist's home and small farm, but today it is a museum and art gallery, kept as it was in Astrup's days, nestled among the steep but fertile slopes on the south side of Jølstravatn. The barn was torn down and rebuilt as a gallery, but in the same style as the old barn. The gallery has permanent exhibitions of Astrup's work such as paintings, graphics, wood-engraving plates and sketches. Most of his scenes have been taken from Jølster and Nikolai Astrup has since remained one of the most Norwegian of our national artists.

Nikolai Astrup lived most of his life in Jølster. Astrup often is regarded as the artist of Western Norway, as he found virtually all of his motives in his home surroundings. He's considered the "most Norwegian" of all the national artists of Norway.

Eikaas Gallery
Another Norwegian painter and graphic artist, Ludvig Eikaas, is closely connected to Jølster. The artist grew up in Jølster, but later moved to Oslo. He is among other things famous for his non-figurative art and portraits/self-portraits.

The Eikaas Gallery was originally an old dairy farm in Ålhus that was purchased by the municipality of Jølster and converted to a modern art gallery. The collection contains about 300 works of art by Ludvig Eikaas.

Jølstra Museum
The Jølstra museum is a private village green with many original Jølstra buildings and a collection of around 3,000 artifacts. There are also exhibitions of paintings by Ludvig Eikaas and Oddvar Torsheim and of Jølster textiles.

Jølster Alpine Ski Centre
Jølster alpine ski centre lies at Vassenden. There are lighted ski trails in the villages of Årdal and Dvergsdalen. Jølster also has mountains for Telemark skiing enthusiasts.

Notable residents

See also
List of former municipalities of Norway

References

External links

Municipal fact sheet from Statistics Norway 

 
Sunnfjord
Former municipalities of Norway
1838 establishments in Norway
2020 disestablishments in Norway